Lemalu Samau Tate Simi (19 October 1952 - 17 April 2014) was a Samoan poet, rugby manager, civil servant and diplomat. He was Samoa's High Commissioner to Australia from 2009 to 2014.

Lemalu trained as an architect in New Zealand and subsequently worked as a civil servant, rising to the position of chief executive of the Ministry of Commerce, Industry and Labour. In January 2009 he was appointed High Commissioner to Australia, a position he held until his death in 2014. He was also the team manager for the Samoa national rugby union team, and president of the Samoan Red Cross.

Works
 A deeper song : poems (1992)

References

2014 deaths
Samoan male poets
Samoan civil servants
Samoan diplomats
1952 births